Her Great Chance is a lost 1918 silent film drama directed by Charles Maigne and starring Alice Brady. It was produced and released by Select Pictures.

Cast
Alice Brady - Lola Gray
David Powell - Charles Cox
Nellie Parker Spaulding - Mrs. Gray
Gloria Goodwin - Ida Bell Gray
Gertrude Barry - Genevieve
Hardee Kirkland - Cox Sr
Ormi Hawley - Kitty
C. A. de Lima - Lawyer
Jefferson De Angelis - Boniface
Louis Sherwin -
Tim Moore - His Great Chance (uncredited)

References

External links
 Her Great Chance at IMDb

1918 films
American silent feature films
Lost American films
American black-and-white films
Silent American drama films
1918 drama films
Selznick Pictures films
Films based on works by Fannie Hurst
1918 lost films
Lost drama films
1910s American films